Enrique César González Lugo (born July 14, 1982) is a Venezuelan former professional baseball pitcher.

Playing career
González made his first start against the Cincinnati Reds on May 28, 2006, pitching six innings for the Arizona Diamondbacks and giving up only one run. He was in the rotation for a majority of the season, but was inconsistent and pitched out of the bullpen for the last few weeks of the season. On September 17, 2007, he was claimed off waivers by the Washington Nationals. On February 5, 2008, González was claimed off waivers by the San Diego Padres. After appearing in four games, he was sent outright to the minors on April 15. He became a free agent at the end of the season. He signed a minor league deal with the Boston Red Sox in December 2008 and was invited to spring training. He spent most of the 2009 season in Triple A before being called up on August 8, 2009 and designated for assignment the next day.

On January 11, 2010, González signed a minor league contract with the Detroit Tigers with an invite to spring training. González was called up on June 10, 2010 to replace the injured Ryan Perry.

The Tigers purchased his contract on May 22, 2011. He was outrighted to Triple-A on June 13.

He spent the summer 2014 in Italy, playing for Rimini Baseball.

During the winters, he is usually back in Venezuela to play for Tiburones de La Guaira.

See also
 List of Major League Baseball players from Venezuela

References

External links

Minor league statistics

1982 births
Living people
Arizona Diamondbacks players
Arizona League Diamondbacks players
Boston Red Sox players
Detroit Tigers players
Diablos Rojos del México players
Lancaster JetHawks players
Major League Baseball pitchers
Major League Baseball players from Venezuela
Mexican League baseball pitchers
Nippon Professional Baseball pitchers
Pawtucket Red Sox players
People from Bolívar (state)
Portland Beavers players
Rimini Baseball Club players
Saitama Seibu Lions players
San Diego Padres players
South Bend Silver Hawks players
Tennessee Smokies players
Tiburones de La Guaira players
Toledo Mud Hens players
Tucson Sidewinders players
Venezuelan expatriate baseball players in Italy
Venezuelan expatriate baseball players in Japan
Venezuelan expatriate baseball players in Mexico
Venezuelan expatriate baseball players in the United States
World Baseball Classic players of Venezuela
Yakima Bears players
2009 World Baseball Classic players
2013 World Baseball Classic players